Alasdair Mitchell (born 1950) is a British classical music conductor.

Mitchell is best known for his recordings with Chandos Records, which include Farrar Orchestral Works. "The pioneering efforts of conductor Alasdair Mitchell… and the Philharmonia do Farrar proud".

Mitchell has also recorded the work of Scottish Classical Composer and Educator John Blackwood McEwen that include ‘A Solway Symphony’, “Mitchell catches all the rich shifting subtleties and glowing colours of Spring Tide and Moonlight”.

Discography

Orchestral recordings

References

External links
 
 Alasdair Mitchell, Spotify
 Alasdair Mitchell, Apple Music

Living people
1950 births
British male conductors (music)
Alumni of the University of Edinburgh
Alumni of the Royal Academy of Music
Academics of the University of Edinburgh
Academics of the Royal Conservatoire of Scotland